This is a list of fictional characters that have been described as tomboys.

Anime and manga

Comics

Film

Literature

Plays

Television

Video games

See also
 Effeminacy
 Geek girl
 Gender
 Gender variance
 Sissy

Explanatory notes

References

Female gender nonconformity
Lists of fictional females
Lists of stock characters